Wang Yu (born January 1964) is a Rear Admiral in the People's Liberation Army Navy of China. He is a member of the Chinese Communist Party. As of September 2015 he was under investigation by the military authorities. Previously he served as head of the Equipment Department of South Sea Fleet.

Biography
Wang was born in January 1964 in Zhijiang, Hubei. After graduating from Yiling High School, he entered Shanghai Jiao Tong University, where he majored in mechanical and power engineering. In December 1987, he enlisted in the People's Liberation Army and was assigned to the Navy Equipment Research Institute. He was elevated to deputy chief engineer in 1994, four years later, he was promoted again to become chief engineer. On July 20, 2007, he promoted to Rear Admiral. He was president of the Navy Equipment Research Institute before serving as Head of the Equipment Department of South Sea Fleet.

In September 2015, he was put under investigation for alleged "serious violations of discipline". Then he was removed from membership of China's national legislature, the National People's Congress.

Wang is a former delegate to the 10th, 11th and 12th National People's Congress.

Personal life
Wang Yu married Xu Ni, a medical doctor who had studied in Germany.

References

External links

1964 births
Politicians from Yichang
Living people
Shanghai Jiao Tong University alumni
People's Liberation Army Navy admirals
People's Liberation Army generals from Hubei
People's Republic of China politicians from Hubei
Chinese Communist Party politicians from Hubei